London Paper Mills F.C. was an English association football club which participated in the Kent Football League and the FA Cup.

References

Defunct football clubs in England
Defunct football clubs in London
Works association football teams in England